Sweet Bird of Youth is a 1959 play by Tennessee Williams.

Sweet Bird of Youth may also refer to:

Film and TV
Sweet Bird of Youth (1962 film), 1962 adaptation of the play starring Paul Newman and Geraldine Page
Sweet Bird of Youth, 1987 short film by Zeinabu irene Davis
Sweet Bird of Youth (1989 film), TV adaptation of the play starring Elizabeth Taylor and Mark Harmon

Music
"Sweet Bird of Youth", 1967 song by The Five Americans released as the B-side to "Zip Code"
Sweet Bird of Youth, 2000 album by The Rock*A*Teens
Sweet Birds of Youth, 2017 album by Richard James Simpson